Almanzor's Rings is a 1977 Soviet action film directed by Igor Voznesensky.

Plot 
Queen Januaria wants to marry both daughters, but Augusta is too evil and Alely always says what she thinks. Suddenly, the wizard Almanzor decides to help them and offers the girls a choice of two rings: the usual ring of gold and the magic ring made of tin.

Cast 
 Svetlana Smirnova as Aneli
 Mikhail Kononov as Zenziver
 Valentina Talyzina as Queen
 Lyudmila Dmitrieva as Avgusta
 Boris Ivanov as Intrigio
 Fyodor Nikitin as Almanzor
 Feliks Rostotsky as Khimio
 Viktor Pavlov as Abaldon
 Roman Tkachuk as Aldebaran
 Leonid Kanevskiy as Mukhamiel

References

External links 
 

1977 films
1970s Russian-language films
Soviet action films
1977 action films
Films based on fairy tales